An INI file is a configuration file for computer software that consists of a text-based content with a structure and syntax comprising key–value pairs for properties, and sections that organize the properties. The name of these configuration files comes from the filename extension INI, for initialization, used in the MS-DOS operating system which popularized this method of software configuration. The format has become an informal standard in many contexts of configuration, but many applications on other operating systems use different file name extensions, such as conf and cfg.

History
The primary mechanism of software configuration in Windows was originally a text file format that comprised text lines with one key–value pair per line, organized into sections. This format was used for operating system components, such as device drivers, fonts, and startup launchers.  INI files were also generally used by applications to store individual settings.

The format was maintained in 16-bit Microsoft Windows platforms up through Windows 3.1x. Starting with Windows 95 Microsoft favored the use of the Windows Registry and began to steer developers away from using INI files for configuration. All subsequent versions of Windows have used the Windows Registry for system configuration, but applications built on the .NET Framework use special XML .config files. The initialization-file functions are still available in Windows and developers may still use them.

Linux and Unix systems also use a similar file format for system configuration. In addition, platform-agnostic software may use this file format for configuration. It is human-readable and simple to parse, so it is a usable format for configuration files that do not require much greater complexity.

Git configuration files are similar to INI files. 

PHP uses the INI format for its "php.ini" configuration file in both Windows and Linux systems.

Desktop.ini files determine the display of directories in Windows, e.g., the icons for a directory.

Example 
The following example file has two sections: one for the owner of the software, and one for a payroll database connection. Comments record the last person who modified the file and the reason for modification.
; last modified 1 April 2001 by John Doe
[owner]
name = John Doe
organization = Acme Widgets Inc.

[database]
; use IP address in case network name resolution is not working
server = 192.0.2.62     
port = 143
file = "payroll.dat"

Format 

INI is an informal format, with features that vary from parser to parser (INI dialects). Some features are more shared across different parsers than others and can be considered as the hard core of the format (e.g. square brackets for sections, newlines for delimiting different nodes, etc.). Attempts to create parsers able to support as many dialects as possible exist, and in its most advanced form the INI format is able to express a tree object with a power comparable to that of other structured formats (JSON, XML) using a more relaxed syntax.

Stable features

Keys (properties) 
The basic element contained in an INI file is the key or property. Every key has a name and a value, delimited by an equals sign (=). The name appears to the left of the equals sign. In the Windows implementation the equal sign and the semicolon are reserved characters and cannot appear in the key. The value can contain any character. 

name = value

Leading and trailing whitespaces around the outside of the property name are ignored.

Sections 
Keys may, but need not, be grouped into arbitrarily named sections. The section name appears on a line by itself, in square brackets ([ and ]). All keys after the section declaration are associated with that section. There is no explicit "end of section" delimiter; sections end at the next section declaration, or at the end of the file. Sections cannot be nested.
[section]
key1 = a
key2 = b

Case sensitivity 
Section and property names are case insensitive.

Comments 
Semicolons at the beginning of the line indicate a comment. Comment lines are ignored.
; comment text

Order of sections and properties 
The order of properties in a section and the order of sections in a file is irrelevant.

Varying features 
As the INI file format is not rigidly defined, many parsers support features beyond the basics already described. The following is a list of some common features, which may or may not be implemented in any given program.

Global properties 
Optional "global" properties may also be allowed, that are declared before any section is declared.

Name/value delimiter
Some implementations allow a colon as the name/value delimiter (instead of the equals sign). Whitespace is occasionally used in the Linux world.

Hierarchy (section nesting) 
Some parsers allow section nesting, using dots as path delimiters:

[section]
domain = wikipedia.org

[section.subsection]
foo = bar

In some cases relative nesting is supported too, where a leading dot expresses nesting to the previous section:

[section]
domain = wikipedia.org

[.subsection]
foo = bar

Historically, ways for expressing nesting alternative to the dot have existed too (for example, IBM's driver file for Microsoft Windows devlist.ini, in which the backslash was used as nesting delimiter in the form of [A\B\C]; or Microsoft Visual Studio's AEMANAGR.INI file, which used a completely different syntax in the form of [A] and B,C,P = V). Some parsers did not offer nesting support at all and were hierarchy-blind, but nesting could still be partially emulated by exploiting the fact that [A.B.C] constitutes a unique identifier.

Comments 
Some software supports the use of the number sign (#) as an alternative to the semicolon for indicating comments, especially under Unix, where it mirrors shell comments. The number sign might be included in the key name in other dialects and ignored as such. For instance, the following line may be interpreted as a comment in one dialect, but create a variable named "#var" in another dialect. If the "#var" value is ignored, it would form a pseudo-implementation of a comment.

#var = a

In some implementations, a comment may begin anywhere on a line after a space (inline comments), including on the same line after properties or section declarations.

foo = bar     # This is another inline comment

In others, including the WinAPI function GetPrivateProfileString, comments must occur on lines by themselves.

Duplicate names 
Most implementations only support having one property with a given name in a section. The second occurrence of a property name may cause an abort, it may be ignored (and the value discarded), or it may override the first occurrence (with the first value discarded). Some programs use duplicate property names to implement multi-valued properties.

Interpretation of multiple section declarations with the same name also varies. In some implementations, duplicate sections simply merge their properties, as if they occurred contiguously. Others may abort, or ignore some aspect of the INI file.

Quoted values 
Some implementations allow values to be quoted, typically using double quotes and/or apostrophes. This allows for explicit declaration of whitespace, and/or for quoting of special characters (equals, semicolon, etc.). The standard Windows function GetPrivateProfileString supports this, and will remove quotation marks that surround the values.

Escape characters 
Some implementations offer varying support for an escape character, typically with the backslash (\) following the C syntax. Some support "line continuation", where a backslash followed immediately by EOL (end-of-line) causes the line break to be ignored, and the "logical line" to be continued on the next actual line from the INI file. Implementation of various "special characters" with escape sequences is also seen.

Accessing INI files 
Under Windows, the Profile API is the programming interface used to read and write settings from classic Windows .ini files. For example, the GetPrivateProfileString function retrieves a string from the specified section in an initialization file.

The following sample C program demonstrates reading property values from the above sample INI file (let the name of configuration file be dbsettings.ini):
#include <windows.h>

int main(int argc, _TCHAR *argv[])
{
  _TCHAR dbserver[1000];
  int dbport;
  GetPrivateProfileString("database", "server", "127.0.0.1", dbserver, sizeof(dbserver) / sizeof(dbserver[0]), ".\\dbsettings.ini");
  dbport = GetPrivateProfileInt("database", "port", 143, ".\\dbsettings.ini");
  // N.B. WritePrivateProfileInt() does not exist
  return 0;
}

The third parameter of the GetPrivateProfileString function is the default value, which are "127.0.0.1" and 143 respectively in the two function calls above. If the argument supplied for this parameter is NULL, the default is an empty string, "".

Under Unix, many different configuration libraries exist to access INI files. They are often already included in frameworks and toolkits. Examples of INI parsers for Unix include GLib, iniparser and libconfini.

Comparison of INI parsers

File mapping 
Initialization file mapping creates a mapping between an INI file and the Registry. It was introduced with Windows NT and Windows 95 as a way to migrate from storing settings in classic .ini files to the new Windows Registry. File mapping traps the Profile API calls and, using settings from the IniFileMapping Registry section, directs reads and writes to appropriate places in the Registry.

Using the example below, a string call could be made to fetch the name key from the owner section from a settings file called, say, dbsettings.ini. The returned value should be the string "John Doe":

GetPrivateProfileString("owner", "name", ... , "c:\\programs\\oldprogram\\dbsettings.ini");

INI mapping takes this Profile API call, ignores any path in the given filename and checks to see if there is a Registry key matching the filename under the directory:

HKEY_LOCAL_MACHINE\Software\Microsoft\Windows NT\   CurrentVersion\IniFileMapping

If this exists, it looks for an entry name matching the requested section. If an entry is found, INI mapping uses its value as a pointer to another part of the Registry. It then looks up the requested INI setting in that part of the Registry.

If no matching entry name is found and there is an entry under the (Default) entry name, INI mapping uses that instead. Thus each section name does not need its own entry.

So, in this case the profile call for the [owner] section is mapped through to:

where the "name" Registry entry name is found to match the requested INI key. The value of "John Doe" is then returned to the Profile call. In this case, the @ prefix on the default prevents any reads from going to the dbsettings.ini file on disk. The result is that any settings not found in the Registry are not looked for in the INI file.

The "database" Registry entry does not have the @ prefix on the value; thus, for the [database] section only, settings in the Registry are taken first followed by settings in the dbsettings.ini file on disk.

Alternatives 
Starting with Windows 95, Microsoft began strongly promoting the use of Windows registry over the INI file. INI files are typically limited to two levels (sections and properties) and do not handle binary data well. This decision however has not been immune to critiques, due to the fact that the registry is monolithic, opaque and binary, must be in sync with the filesystem, and represents a single point of failure for the operating system.

Later XML-based configuration files became a popular choice for encoding configuration in text files. XML allows arbitrarily complex levels and nesting, and has standard mechanisms for encoding binary data.

More recently, data serialization formats, such as JSON, TOML, and YAML can serve as configuration formats. These three alternative formats can nest arbitrarily, but have a different syntax than the INI file.  Among them, TOML most closely resembles INI, but the idea to make TOML deliberately compatible with a large subset of INI was rejected.

The newest INI parsers however allow the same arbitrary level of nesting of XML, JSON, TOML, and YAML, offer equivalent support of typed values and Unicode, although keep the "informal status" of INI files by allowing multiple syntaxes for expressing the same thing.

See also 
 BOOT.INI
 MSConfig
 Sysedit
 SYSTEM.INI
 TOML, a very similar but more formally-specified configuration file format
 WIN.INI
 Amiga's IFF files
 .DS_Store
 .properties

References 

 Infobox - http://filext.com/file-extension/INI
 Infobox - https://wikiext.com/ini

External links 
 libconfini's Library Function Manual: The particular syntax allowed by libconfini.
 Cloanto Implementation of INI File Format: The particular syntax allowed by a parser implemented by Cloanto.
 A very simple data file metaformat: INI parser tutorial in Apache Groovy.
 Microsoft's GetPrivateProfileString() and WritePrivateProfileStringA() functions

Configuration files
Computer file formats